Dhananjay "Dan" Gode is a Clinical Associate Professor of Accounting, Taxation, and Business law at New York University Stern School of Business. He teaches courses in corporate financial accounting, and also teaches for the TRIUM Global Executive MBA Program, an alliance of NYU Stern, the London School of Economics and HEC School of Management.

Biography
Gode holds an undergraduate degree in electronics and communication engineering from Indian Institute of Technology (BHU) Varanasi, and an MBA from Indian Institute of Management Calcutta. He also has master's degrees in Information Systems and Accounting, and a PhD in Accounting, from Carnegie Mellon University yet was quoted in his Financial Statement Modeling class at NYU Stern on March 11, 2015 as saying that he "has only taken one accounting course" in his entire career.

Gode’s primary research areas include financial analysis, programming, legal liability of firms, valuation, managerial accounting, and performance measurement. From 1993-98, he was an Assistant Professor of Accounting at the William E. Simon Graduate School of Business Administration at the University of Rochester. Professor Gode is the co-founder of the Almaris E-Learning Systems.

Teaching awards
Gode is the recipient of several teaching awards within the NYU Stern School of Business.

Honors and awards
Richard M. and Margaret S. Cyert Family Fellowship, given to the doctoral student who "best demonstrates the capacity for interdisciplinary work of unusual vision, originality, imagination and creativity," Graduate School of Industrial Administration, Carnegie Mellon University, 1991. 
Doctoral Consortium Fellow at the American Accounting Association, Tahoe City, California, 1991. 
Deloitte and Touche Foundation Fellow, 1990-1993. 
William Larimer Mellon Fellowship, Graduate School of Industrial Administration, Carnegie Mellon University, 1988-1991

Course development
Developed the Financial Accounting Tutor, a comprehensive interactive software package to teach financial accounting. The software is being published by John Wiley and Sons Inc. The software helps students learn basic accounting concepts on their own thereby freeing up class time for discussions of managerial issues. 
Developed a new course on Modeling Financial Statements

Publications
Professor Gode has written over 100 publications, papers, presentations, and citations.  He has also been published in the Quarterly Journal of Economics and in the Journal of Political Economy.

Education
Professor Gode received his BS in electronics and communication engineering from the Indian Institute of Technology (BHU) Varanasi, India and his MBA from the Indian Institute of Management Calcutta.  He also received his MS in information systems, MS in accounting, and his Doctor of Philosophy in accounting with a minor in information from Carnegie Mellon University.

References

External links
NYU Stern Biography
Dan Gode’s Personal Website
TRIUM Global Executive MBA Program
Dan Gode’s Seminar Listings
Almaris Website

New York University Stern School of Business faculty
University of Rochester faculty
Indian Institute of Management Calcutta alumni
Indian Institute of Technology (BHU) Varanasi alumni
Tepper School of Business alumni
Living people
Year of birth missing (living people)